The International Academy of Osteopathy (IAO) was founded in 1987 by Grégoire Lason who still is the Principal.

The IAO is an international college that offers its Training and Education in Austria, Belgium, Denmark, Egypt, Germany, Italy, the Netherlands and Switzerland which leads to several degrees in osteopathy:

 Diploma in Osteopathy (DO), 
 Master of Science in Osteopathy (MSc.Ost.) in co-operation with Buckinghamshire New University. This Master degree is a legally recognized diploma in over 45 European countries.
 Post Graduate Certificates of the IAO,
 Post Graduate Certificates of Buckinghamshire New University.

The programs are accredited thanks to agreements with Buckinghamshire New University and are in accordance with the Bologna process.

Austria (AT) 
Modular Program:

 In German in Innsbruck, Linz and Wien. This is a part-time training and education for physiotherapists and medical doctors. After successfully completing this 4-year program, students obtain the unique British Master of Science in Osteopathy (MSc.Ost.), from Buckinghamshire New University, as well as the DO degree from The International Academy of Osteopathy (IAO).
 Several Post-Academic-Modules (PAM): In English and German (Pediatric Osteopathy, Sports Osteopathy, etc.) These modules are for osteopaths with minimum DO wanting to stay on top of the scientific evolutions within the profession. Through these Post Academic Modules, also MSc.Ost. degrees are possible.

Belgium (BE) 

Modular Program:
In Dutch in Antwerp (B) and Ghent (B). This is a part-time training and education for physiotherapists and medical doctors. After successfully completing this 4-year program, students obtain the unique British Master of Science in Osteopathy (MSc.Ost.), from Buckinghamshire New University, as well as the DO degree from The International Academy of Osteopathy (IAO).
in French in Mont-Saint-Guibert (B). This is a part-time training and education for physiotherapists and medical doctors. After successfully completing this 5-year program, students obtain the DO degree from The International Academy of Osteopathy (IAO).
Several Post-Academic-Modules (PAM): In English (Pediatric Osteopathy, Sports Osteopathy, etc.) These modules are for osteopaths with minimum DO wanting to stay on top of the scientific evolutions within the profession. Through these Post Academic Modules, also MSc.Ost. degrees are possible.

Denmark (DK) 

Modular Program:

 In English in Copenhagen (DK). This is a part-time training and education for physiotherapists and medical doctors. After successfully completing this 4-year program, students obtain the unique British Master of Science in Osteopathy (MSc.Ost.), from Buckinghamshire New University, as well as the DO degree from The International Academy of Osteopathy (IAO).
 Several Post-Academic-Modules (PAM): Several subjects in English (Sports Osteopathy, Pediatric Osteopathy, etc). These modules are for osteopaths with DO wanting to stay on top of scientific evolutions within the profession. Through these Post Academic Modules, also MSc.Ost. degrees are possible.

Egypt (EG) 

Modular Program:

 In English in Cairo (EG) This is a part-time training and education for physiotherapists and medical doctors. After successfully completing this 5-year program, students obtain the DO degree from The International Academy of Osteopathy (IAO).

Germany (DE) 

Modular Program:

 In German in 14 cities. This is a part-time training and education for physiotherapists and medical doctors. After successfully completing this 5-year program, students obtain the DO degree from The International Academy of Osteopathy (IAO).  
 Several Post-Academic-Modules (PAM): Several subjects in German (Sports Osteopathy, Pediatric Osteopathy, etc). These modules are for osteopaths with DO wanting to stay on top of scientific evolutions within the profession. Through these Post Academic Modules, also MSc.Ost. degrees are possible.

Italy 
Modular Program:

 In German in Brixen (Südtirol). This is a part-time training and education for physiotherapists and medical doctors. After successfully completing this 4-year program, students obtain the unique British Master of Science in Osteopathy (MSc.Ost.), from Buckinghamshire New University, as well as the DO degree from The International Academy of Osteopathy (IAO).

Switzerland (CH)
Modular Program:

 In German in Brunnen. This is a part-time training and education for physiotherapists and medical doctors. After successfully completing this 4-year program, students obtain the unique British Master of Science in Osteopathy (MSc.Ost.), from Buckinghamshire New University, as well as the DO degree from The International Academy of Osteopathy (IAO).
 Several Post-Academic-Modules (PAM): In English and German (Pediatric Osteopathy, Sports Osteopathy, etc.) These modules are for osteopaths with minimum DO wanting to stay on top of the scientific evolutions within the profession. Through these Post Academic Modules, also MSc.Ost. degrees are possible.

The Netherlands (NL) 
Modular Program:

 In Dutch in Zeist (NL). This is a part-time training and education for physiotherapists and medical doctors. After successfully completing this 4-year program, students obtain the unique British Master of Science in Osteopathy (MSc.Ost.), from Buckinghamshire New University, as well as the DO degree from The International Academy of Osteopathy (IAO).
 Several Post-Academic-Modules (PAM): In English (Pediatric Osteopathy, Sports Osteopathy, etc.) These modules are for osteopaths with minimum DO wanting to stay on top of the scientific evolutions within the profession. Through these Post Academic Modules, also MSc.Ost. degrees are possible.

References

External links 
 International Academy of Osteopathy website

Educational institutions established in 1987
Osteopathic colleges